, abbreviated as , is a public research university located in Osaka Prefecture, Japan. It is one of Japan's former Imperial Universities and a Designated National University listed as a "Top Type" university in the Top Global University Project. The university is often ranked among the top three public universities in Japan, along with the University of Tokyo and Kyoto University. It is ranked third overall among Japanese universities and 75th worldwide in the 2022 QS World University Rankings.

Osaka University was one of the earliest modern universities in Japan at its founding in 1931. The history of the institution includes much older predecessors in Osaka such as the Kaitokudō founded in 1724 and the Tekijuku founded in 1838. In 2007, it merged with Osaka University of Foreign Studies and became the largest national university in Japan.

Osaka University is one of the most productive research institutions in Japan. Numerous prominent scholars and scientists have attended or worked at Osaka University, such as Nobel Laureate in Physics Hideki Yukawa, manga artist Osamu Tezuka, Lasker Award winner Hidesaburō Hanafusa, author Ryōtarō Shiba, and discoverer of regulatory T cells Shimon Sakaguchi.

History

The spirit of the university's humanities programmes is believed to be intimately rooted in the history of the Kaitokudō, whereas that of the natural and applied sciences is based upon the traditions of the Tekijuku.
Osaka University traces its modern origins back the founding of Osaka Prefectural Medical School in downtown Osaka City in 1869. The school was later designated the Osaka Prefectural Medical College with university status by the University Ordinance (Imperial Ordinance No. 388) in 1919. The Medical College merged with the newly founded College of Science to form Osaka Imperial University in 1931. Osaka Imperial University was the sixth imperial university in Japan. Osaka Technical College was incorporated to form the School of Engineering two years later. The entire university was renamed Osaka University in 1947.

After merging with Naniwa High School and Osaka High School as a result of the government's education system reform in 1949, Osaka University started its postwar era with five faculties: Science, Medicine, Engineering, Letters, and Law. Since that time new faculties and research institutes have been established, including the first Japanese School of Engineering Science and the School of Human Sciences, which covers such cross-disciplinary research interests as broadly as psychology, sociology, and education. Built on the then-existing faculties, ten graduate schools were set up as part of the government's education system reform program in 1953. Two more graduate faculties were added in 1994.

In 1993, Osaka University Hospital was relocated from the Nakanoshima campus in downtown Osaka to the Suita campus, completing the implementation of the university's plan to integrate the scattered facilities into the Suita and Toyonaka campuses. In October 2007, a merger between Osaka University and the Osaka University of Foreign Studies in Minoh was completed. The merger made Osaka University one of two national universities in the country with a School of Foreign Studies, along with the Tokyo University of Foreign Studies. The merger also made Osaka University the largest national university in Japan.

Campuses

Suita, Toyonaka, and Minoh are the contemporary university's three campuses. Home to the university's headquarters, the Suita campus extends across Suita City and Ibaraki City in Osaka Prefecture. The Suita campus houses faculties of Human Sciences, Medicine, Dentistry, Pharmaceutical Sciences, and Engineering. It contains the Graduate School of Frontier Biosciences and a portion of the Graduate School of Information Science and Technology. The campus is also home to the Osaka University Hospital and the Nationwide Joint Institute of Cybermedia Center and Research Center for Nuclear Physics.

The Toyonaka campus is home to faculties of Letters, Law, Economics, Science, and Engineering Science. It is also the academic base for Graduate Schools of International Public Policy, Language and Culture, a portion of Information Science, and the Center for the Practice of Legal and Political Expertise. All undergraduates attend classes on the Toyonaka campus during their first year of enrollment. Sports activities are primarily concentrated on the Toyonaka campus, with the exception of tennis, which is located in Suita.

The Minoh campus was incorporated following the merger with the Osaka University of Foreign Studies in October 2007. The Minoh campus is home to the School of Foreign Studies, the Research Institute for World Languages, and the Center for Japanese Language and Culture.

In addition to these three campuses, the former Nakanoshima campus, the university's earliest campus located in downtown Osaka, served as the hub for the faculty of medicine until the transfer to the Suita campus was completed in 1993. In April 2004, the Nakanoshima campus became the university's Nakanoshima Center, serving as a venue for information exchange, adult education classes, and activities involving academic as well as non-academic communities.

Organization
Osaka University is organized into 11 faculties for undergraduate programs and 16 graduate schools. The undergraduate programs are the School of Letters, School of Human Sciences, School of Foreign Studies, School of Law, School of Economics, School of Science, Faculty of Medicine, Faculty of Dentistry, School of Pharmaceutical Science, School of Engineering, and School of Engineering Science. The graduate programs are in the Graduate School of Letters, Graduate School of Human Sciences, Graduate School of Law and Politics, Graduate School of Economics, Graduate School of Science, Graduate School of Medicine, Graduate School of Dentistry, Graduate School of Pharmaceutical Sciences, Graduate School of Engineering, Graduate School of Engineering Science, Graduate School of Language and Culture, Osaka School of International Public Policy, Graduate School of Information Science and Technology, Graduate School of Frontier Biosciences, Graduate School of Law (Law School), and United Graduate School of Child Development out of "Osaka University, Kanazawa University, Hamamatsu University School of Medicine, Chiba University, and University of Fukui".

Osaka University also has 21 research institutes, 4 libraries, and 2 university hospitals.

Some staff at Osaka University are represented by the General Union, a member of the National Union of General Workers, which is itself a member of the National Trade Union Council.

Osaka University maintains four overseas Centers for Education and Research, in San Francisco, Groningen, Bangkok, and Shanghai.

English-medium programs 
Osaka University's School of Human Sciences on the Suita Campus hosts an English-medium four-year undergraduate degree program. The program started in 2011 as a result of the national government's G30 (Global 30) Project. Although the government ended the G30 Project in 2014 and replaced it with the Top Global University Project, the Human Sciences International Undergraduate Program at Osaka University continues.

Areas of study include sociology, anthropology, philosophy, education, behavioral sciences, psychology, human development, and area studies. Focus is on the development of an interdisciplinary, international, and problem-solving orientation to research and education. The degree programme is based on international benchmarking standards, has competitive entry requirements and attracts students from all over the world. The current director of this programme is Professor Beverley Yamamoto, who leads a UNESCO Chair in Global Health and Education.

Osaka University's Graduate School of Letters hosts another English-medium program in Global Japanese Studies for graduate students, one of the Graduate Programs for Advanced Interdisciplinary Studies.

Academic alliances
Osaka University has completed academic exchange agreements with a large number of universities (92 as of 2011) throughout the world and also exchange agreements between schools at Osaka University and schools and institutes in other countries (366 as of 2011). These agreements facilitate the visits of international students studying at Osaka University and the travel of Osaka University students studying at overseas universities, schools, and institutes. In many cases students are able to participate in these exchange agreements without paying additional tuition.

Osaka University's academic alliances include Cornell University (1989), Harvard University (2008), Stanford University (2008), and the California Institute of Technology (2008) in the United States, McGill University (1996) and the University of Toronto (1999) in Canada, Seoul National University (2000) and Yonsei University (1998) in South Korea, Peking University (2001) and Tsinghua University (2004) in China, the National University of Singapore (2008), and Australian National University (1995). In Europe, alliances include the University of Bologna (2006), University of Geneva (2007), and the University of Cologne (1982). Allied institutions in the United Kingdom include the University of Oxford (1997) and Imperial College London (2006).

Academic rankings

Osaka University is considered one of the most prestigious universities in Japan, as seen in various foreign and domestic rankings. Internationally, Osaka University was ranked 71st among the world's best universities and the third best Japanese university in 2020 according to the QS World University Rankings produced by Quacquarelli Symonds. Osaka University is third in Japan and 53rd worldwide in the 2019 Center for World University Rankings. It is also ranked third in Japan in the 2019 Times Higher Education World University Rankings. Domestically, the university was ranked third in 2009 and fourth in 2008 and 2010 in the ranking "Truly Strong Universities" by Toyo Keizai, which measures alumni productivity.

Osaka University is one of the most productive research institutions in Japan. According to Thomson Reuters, Osaka University among the three top research universities in Japan and is the second most innovative university in the country (22nd worldwide). Its research is noted in such fields as immunology (first in Japan and fourth in the world), material science (fourth in Japan, fifteenth in the world), and chemistry (fifth in Japan, fourteenth in the world).  also reported that Osaka University has the seventh highest research funding per researcher in the Japanese . Osaka University had the third most patents accepted (150) among Japanese universities during 2017.

Osaka University also has a high research reputation in Economics. Repec ranked Osaka's economics department second in Japan in 2011. Osaka University graduates has served as presidents of the Japanese Economic Association five times in its history.

According to the 's 2010 rankings, graduates from Osaka University have the seventh highest employment rate among the 400 major companies in Japan.

Popularity and selectivity
Osaka University is one of the most selective universities in Japan. Its entrance difficulty is usually considered one of the highest in Japan.

Nikkei BP's "Brand rankings of Japanese universities" ranks Osaka University's brand the second strongest in the Kansai region after Kyoto University.

Evaluation from Business World

Athletics
Osaka University and Nagoya University hold regular Athletics Competition every year (名古屋大学・大阪大学対抗競技大会). Recent years Osaka also has a regular windsurfing competition relationship with Kyoto University, Kobe University (京阪神戦), and Taiwan's National Sun Yat-sen University (大阪大学・台湾中山大学ヨット定期戦).

Notable people

Physics, Chemistry, and Technologies

Shoichi Sakata (坂田 昌一), a physicist, known for Sakata model, Nobel Prize in Physics nominee.
Takeo Matsubara (松原 武生), a Japanese physicist at Kyoto University, 1961 Nishina Memorial Prize winner.
Oda Minoru (小田 稔), Japanese astronomer and astrophysicist, Emeritus Professor at the University of Tokyo.
Yoshiaki Arata (荒田 吉明), pioneering researchers into nuclear fusion.
Shigeo Satomura (里村 茂夫), a Japanese physicist.
Akira Hasegawa (長谷川 晃), a theoretical physicist and engineer.
Takashi Hibiki (日引 俊詞), a Japanese scientist who is a professor emeritus of nuclear engineering at Purdue University.
Yasuo Tanaka (田中 靖郎), a Japanese astrophysicist and a member of the Japan Academy.
Sonia Contera, a Spanish physicist, serves st the University of Oxford.
Satoshi Kawata (河田 聡), a scientist in nanotechnology, photonics.
Satoshi Hiyamizu (冷水 佐壽), a Japanese professor of electrical engineering.
Tadao Kasami (嵩 忠雄),  Japanese information theorist, IEEE Fellow, 1999 IEEE Claude E. Shannon Award winner.
Tetsuo Asano (浅野 哲夫), computer scientist, the president of the Japan Advanced Institute of Science and Technology (JAIST).
Wahid Shams Kolahi, an Iranian scientist and electrical engineer.
Kilnam Chon, a South Korean computer scientist.
Nguyễn Ngọc Bình, a Vietnamese computer scientist.

Sciences

Li Siguang (李四光), a Chinese geologist and politician.
Hidesaburo Hanafusa (花房 秀三郎),  a Japanese virologist, 1982 Albert Lasker Award for Basic Medical Research winner.
Osamu Hayaishi (早石 修), 1986 Wolf Prize laureate in Medicine winner.
Shizuo Akira (審良 静男), immunologists, 2011 Gairdner Award winner.
Yoshio Okamoto (岡本 佳男), a Japanese chemist, 2019 Japan Prize winner.
Yukihiro Ozaki (尾崎 幸洋), a Japanese scientist at Kwansei Gakuin University.
Tomoaki Kato (加藤 友朗), a pioneer in multiple-organ transplantation.
Toshio Yanagida (柳田 敏雄), a Japanese biophysicist.
Yoshizumi Ishino (石野 良純), a Japanese molecular biologist, known for his discovering the DNA sequence of CRISPR.
Kiyoshi Mizuuchi (水内 潔), a Japanese biochemist.
Yusuke Nakamura (中村 祐輔), a Japanese prominent geneticist and cancer researcher.

Business and Arts

Kunio Nakamura (中村 邦夫), businessman, the president of Panasonic.
Takamitsu Azuma (東 孝光), Architect. Professor of Osaka University (1985-1997), Emeritus Professor
Seishi Yokomizo (横溝 正史), novelist and creator of the private detective Kosuke Kindaichi.
Toshio Masuda (舛田 利雄), film director
Tetsurō Itodani (糸谷 哲郎), professional shogi player and Ryūō champion.
Junzo Shono (庄野 潤三),  a Japanese novelist, 1954 Akutagawa Prize winner.
Chin Shunshin (陳 舜臣), a Taiwanese-Japanese novelist, 1968 Naoki Prize winner.
Glenn Hook, a British academic at the University of Sheffield.
Tatsuhiko Seo (妹尾 達彦), a Japanese historian.
Shūdō Higashinakano (東中野 修道), a Japanese historian.
Yutaka Tsujinaka (辻中 豊),  a professor of political science at the University of Tsukuba.
Keiko McDonald, an American orientalist.
Akiko Kiso, a Japanese classicist

Mathematic and Economic

Hiroshi Haruki (春木 博), mathematician, author of Haruki's theorem and Haruki's Lemma.
Tadashi Nakayama (中山正), a mathematician who made important contributions to representation theory.
Katsumi Nomizu (野水 克己), a Japanese-American mathematician known for his work in differential geometry.
Hidehiko Yamabe (山辺 英彦), a Japanese mathematician known for Yamabe flow, Yamabe invariant, Yamabe problem.
Toru Kumon (公文 公), a Japanese mathematics educator, developer of Kumon method.
Kengo Hirachi (平地 健吾), a Japanese mathematician, specializing in CR geometry and mathematical analysis.
Yozo Matsushima (松島 与三), a Japanese mathematician.
Masao Ogaki (大垣 昌夫), a Japanese economist at Keio University.
Giorgio Brunello, an Italian economist.
Kazuya Kamiya (神谷 和也), Japanese economics, professor at Kobe University.
Takero Doi (土居 丈朗), Japanese economist.

Politics

Shuzen Tanigawa (谷川 秀善), a Japanese politician of the Liberal Democratic Party, a member of the House of Councillors (Japan) in the Diet.
Satoshi Umemura (梅村 聡), a Japanese politician of the Democratic Party of Japan, a member of the House of Councillors (Japan) in the Diet.
Mitsuo Mitani (三谷 光男), a Japanese politician of the Democratic Party of Japan, a member of the House of Representatives (Japan) in the Diet
Tadashi Maeda (前田 正), a Japanese politician served s in the House of Representatives (Japan).
Wataru Ito (伊藤 渉), a Japanese politician of the New Komeito Party.
Keisuke Kihara (木原 敬介), a former mayor of Sakai, Osaka in Japan.
Ko Ko Oo, scientist and former Minister of Science and Technology of Burma
Fathimath Dhiyana Saeed, SAARC Secretary-General

Entertainment creators

Harue Tsutsumi (堤 春恵), a Japanese playwright.
Koushun Takami (高見 広春), journalist and author of Battle Royale
Taku Mayumura (眉村 卓), a Japanese novelist, science fiction writer, 1974 and 1996 Seiun Award winner.
Akira Hori (堀 晃), a Japanese science fiction writer, 1980 Nihon SF Taisho Award and Seiun Award winner.
Yasumi Kobayashi (小林 泰三),  a Japanese author of horror, science fiction, and mystery, 2012 and 2017 Seiun Award winner.
Takahiro Kimura (木村 貴宏), a Japanese animator, illustrator and character designer.
Ichirō Sakaki (榊 一郎), a Japanese light novel writer.

Media
Handai Post - student newspaper
Handai Walker - student newspaper

Notes and references

External links

 

 
University
Educational institutions established in 1931
Japanese national universities
National Seven Universities
1931 establishments in Japan
Super Global Universities
Kansai Collegiate American Football League